Purani Kabar is a Hindi horror film of Bollywood directed by K.I. Seikh and produced by M. Kartik. This movie was released in 1998 under the banner of Heena Films.

Plot
Four friends in different religions buy lottery ticket for each. The seller sells the last ticket to their fifth friend and after the lucky draw the fifth friend wins the money. The other four claim that they should have an equal share in that prize. The winner friend refuses to give share, they kill him and steal the ticket money. When the wife of the deceased friend charges them they also drive her away. Years latter deceased son grows up and become a police officer and knows about the murder of his father.

Cast
 Mohan Joshi
 Jack Gaud as Demon
 Harish Patel
 Kiran Kumar
 Poonam Dasgupta
 Jyothi Rana
 Vinod Tripathi as dance master
 Kirti Shetty as Lalita
 Rajeev Raj as Inspector Vishal
 Mohini as Madhu
 Jayant Patekar
 Johny Nirmal as Dancer
 Firdaus Mewawala as Kanu

References

External links
 

1998 films
Indian horror films
1990s Hindi-language films
1998 horror films
Hindi-language horror films